Pessocosma iolealis is a moth of the family Crambidae. It is found in Australia.

References

Spilomelinae
Moths described in 1859